This is a list of 240 species in Hydrellia, a genus of shore flies in the family Ephydridae.

Hydrellia species

H. acutipennis Harrison, 1959 c g
H. administrata Bock, 1990 c g
H. advenae Cresson, 1934
H. affinis Meigen, 1838
H. agitator Deonier, 1971
H. ainsworthi Deonier, 1971
H. alabamae Deonier, 1993
H. albiceps (Meigen, 1824)
H. albifacies (Adams, 1905)
H. albifrons (Fallén, 1813)
H. albilabris (Meigen, 1830)
H. alboguttata Loew, 1845
H. americana Cresson, 1931
H. amnicola Deonier, 1971
H. amplecta Deonier, 1995
H. anguliterga Deeming, 2002
H. annulata Loew, 1845
H. apalachee Deonier, 1993
H. approximata Becker, 1903
H. argyrogenia Becker, 1896
H. argyrostoma (Stenhammar, 1844)
H. armata Canzoneri & Meneghini, 1976 c g
H. ascita Cresson, 1942
H. asymmetrica Papp, 1983 c g
H. atlas Vitte, 1989 c g
H. atroglauca Coquillett, 1910
H. aurifer Cresson, 1932
H. balciunasi Bock, 1990 c g
H. bergi Cresson, 1941
H. bezzii Cogan, 1980 c g
H. bicarina Deonier, 1995
H. bicolor Meigen, 1838
H. bicolorithorax Giordani Soika, 1956 c g
H. bilobifera Cresson, 1936 i c g
H. biloxiae Deonier, 1971
H. bionotata Canzoneri & Meneghini, 1969 c g
H. bocaiuvensis Rodrigues, Mathi & Couri, 2014 g
H. bogorae Deonier, 1993
H. borealis Cresson, 1944 i c g
H. brunifacies Robineau-Desvoidy, 1830
H. brunnipleura Giordani Soika, 1956 c g
H. bryani Deonier, 1995
H. bumbunae Canzoneri, 1982 c g
H. caesia (Stenhammar, 1844)
H. caledonica Collin, 1966 c g
H. caliginosa Cresson, 1936 i c g
H. calverti Cresson, 1918 c g
H. canzonerii Zatwarnicki, 1988 c g
H. cardamines Haliday, 1839 c g
H. careelensis Bock, 1990 c g
H. cavator Deonier, 1971
H. cephalotes Canzoneri & Meneghini, 1969 c g
H. ceramensis Meijere, 1913 c g
H. cessator Deonier, 1971
H. chinensis Qi & Li, 1983 c g
H. chrisina Robineau-Desvoidy, 1830
H. chrysella Robineau-Desvoidy, 1830
H. cinerascens Macquart, 1835 c g
H. cochleariae Haliday, 1839 c g
H. columbata Deonier, 1971
H. concii Canzoneri & Meneghini, 1975 c g
H. concolor (Stenhammar, 1844)
H. conformis Loew, 1869 i c g
H. congensis Giordani Soika, 1956 c g
H. crassipes Cresson, 1931
H. cruralis Coquillett, 1910
H. decens Cresson, 1931
H. deceptor Deonier, 1971
H. definita Cresson, 1944 i c g
H. discursa Deonier, 1971
H. dubia Dahl, 1968 c g
H. egeriae Rodrigues, Mathis & Hauser, 2015 g
H. elegans Dahl, 1973 c g
H. enderbii (Hutton, 1901) c g
H. fascitibia (Roser, 1840) c g
H. feijeni Deeming, 2002
H. flaviceps (Meigen, 1830)
H. flavicornis (Fallén, 1823) c g
H. flavicoxalis Cresson, 1944 i c g
H. flavipes Macquart, 1835 c g
H. floridana Deonier, 1971
H. formosa Loew, 1861 i c g
H. frontalis Loew, 1860 c g
H. frontosa Becker, 1926 c g
H. fuliginosa Robineau-Desvoidy, 1830
H. fulviceps (Stenhammar, 1844)
H. fulvipes Macquart, 1835 c g
H. fusca (Stenhammar, 1844)
H. geniculata (Stenhammar, 1844)
H. genitalis Bock, 1990 c g
H. gentilis Dahl, 1968 c g
H. ghanii Deonier, 1978 c g
H. gladiator Deonier, 1971
H. griseola (Fallén, 1813)
H. harti Cresson, 1936 i c g
H. hawaiiensis Cresson, 1936 i c g
H. huttoni Cresson, 1948 c g
H. idolator Deonier, 1971
H. indicae Deonier, 1978 c g
H. insulata Deonier, 1971
H. inusitata Canzoneri & Rampini, 1998 c g
H. ipsata Zatwarnicki, 1988 c g
H. ischiaca Loew, 1862 i c g
H. italica Canzoneri & Meneghini, 1974 c g
H. itascae Deonier, 1971
H. johnsoni Cresson, 1941
H. karenae Canzoneri, 1996 c g
H. lappoinca (Stenhammar, 1844)
H. lata Cresson, 1944 i c g
H. laticapsula Deonier, 1993
H. laticeps (Stenhammar, 1844)
H. latipalpis Cresson, 1943 c g
H. leannae Bock, 1990 c g
H. limnobii Deonier, 1993
H. limosina Becker, 1903
H. lineata Macquart, 1835 c g
H. litoralis Miyagi, 1977 c g
H. longiseta Rodrigues, Mathi & Couri, 2014 g
H. lucida Macquart, 1835 c g
H. luctuosa Cresson, 1942
H. lunata Cresson, 1932
H. luteipes Cresson, 1932
H. maculiventris Becker, 1896
H. magna Miyagi, 1977 c g
H. manitobae Deonier, 1971
H. mareeba Bock, 1990 c g
H. maura Meigen, 1838
H. mayoli Canzoneri & Rallo, 1996 c g
H. meigeni Zatwarnicki, 1988 c g
H. melanderi Deonier, 1971
H. meneghinii Canzoneri, 1996 c g
H. michelae Bock, 1990 c g
H. minutissima Papp, 1983 c g
H. morrisoni Cresson, 1924 i c g
H. mutata (Zetterstedt, 1846) c g
H. naivashae Canzoneri & Raffone, 1987 c g
H. najadis Deonier, 1993
H. nemoralis Dahl, 1968 c g
H. nigra Canzoneri, 1982 c g
H. nigricans (Stenhammar, 1844)
H. nigriceps (Meigen, 1830)
H. nigripes Robineau-Desvoidy, 1830
H. nigroquadrimaculata Giordani Soika, 1956 c g
H. nitida Robineau-Desvoidy, 1830
H. nobilis (Loew, 1862) i c g
H. nostimoides Frey, 1958 c g
H. notata Deonier, 1971
H. notiphiloides Cresson, 1924 i c g
H. novaezealandiae Harrison, 1959 c g
H. nympheae (Stenhammar, 1844)
H. obscura (Meigen, 1830)
H. ocalae Deonier, 1995
H. ochtheroides Canzoneri & Rampini, 1998 c g
H. opaca Meigen, 1838
H. orientalis Miyagi, 1977 c g
H. osorno Cresson, 1931
H. otteliae Séguy, 1951 c g
H. padi Canzoneri & Meneghini, 1985 c g
H. pakistanae Deonier, 1978 c g
H. pallipes (Meigen, 1830)
H. parafrontosa Papp, 1983 c g
H. penicili Cresson, 1944 c g
H. penicilli Cresson, 1944 i c
H. perfida Canzoneri & Rampini, 1994 c g
H. perplexa Bock, 1990 c g
H. personata Deonier, 1971
H. philippina Ferino, 1968 c g
H. pilitarsis (Stenhammar, 1844)
H. platygastra Cresson, 1931
H. poecilogastra Becker, 1903
H. pontederiae Deonier, 1993
H. porphyrops Haliday, 1839 c g
H. portis Cresson, 1932
H. proclinata Cresson, 1915 i c g
H. procteri Cresson, 1934
H. propinqua Wahlgren, 1947 c g
H. prosternalis Deeming, 1977 c g
H. prudens Curran, 1930 i c g
H. pseudopulchella Canzoneri & Rampini, 1998 c g
H. pubescens Becker, 1926 c g
H. pulchella Canzoneri & Meneghini, 1969 c g
H. pulla Cresson, 1931
H. punctum Becker, 1909 c g
H. raffonei Canzoneri & Rampini, 1989 c g
H. ranunculi Haliday, 1839 c g
H. rharbia Vitte, 1989 c g
H. rixator Deonier, 1971
H. sagittata Canzoneri & Rampini, 1998 c g
H. saharae Giordani Soika, 1956 c g
H. saltator Deonier, 1971
H. sarahae Deonier, 1993
H. sasakii Yuasa & Isitani, 1939 c g
H. scarpai Canzoneri & Vienna, 1987 c g
H. schneiderae Rodrigues, Mathi & Couri, 2014 g
H. serena Cresson, 1931
H. serica Bock, 1990 c g
H. similis Rodrigues, Mathi & Couri, 2014 g
H. simplex Rodrigues, Mathi & Couri, 2014 g
H. soikai Cogan, 1980 c g
H. spicornis Cresson, 1918 i c g
H. spinicornis Cresson, 1918 c g
H. stratiotae Hering, 1925 c g
H. stratiotella Wahlgren, 1947 c g
H. subalbiceps Collin, 1966 c g
H. subnitens Cresson, 1931
H. surata Deonier, 1971
H. suspecta Cresson, 1936 i c g
H. svecica Zatwarnicki, 1988 c g
H. tarsata Haliday, 1839 c g
H. tenebricosa Collin, 1939 c g
H. thoracica Haliday, 1839 c g
H. tibialis Cresson, 1917 i c g
H. tibiospica Deonier, 1995
H. toma Mathis & Zatwarnicki, 2010 c g
H. tozzii Canzoneri & Raffone, 1987 c g
H. trichaeta Cresson, 1944 i c g
H. trifasciata Bock, 1990 c g
H. tritici Coquillett, 1903 c g
H. unigena Cresson, 1944 c g
H. valerosiae Canzoneri & Rampini, 1990 c g
H. valida Loew, 1862 i c g b
H. varipes Lamb, 1912 c g
H. velutinifrons Tonnoir & Malloch, 1926 c g
H. victoria Cresson, 1932
H. vidua Cresson, 1932
H. vilelai Rodrigues, Mathi & Couri, 2014 g
H. viridescens Robineau-Desvoidy, 1830
H. viridula Robineau-Desvoidy, 1830
H. vulgaris Cresson, 1931
H. warsakensis Deonier, 1978 c g
H. wilburi Cresson, 1944 i c g
H. williamsi Cresson, 1936 i c g
H. wirthi Korytkowski, 1982 c g
H. wirthiana Deonier, 1997 c g
H. xanthocera Cresson, 1938 c g

Data sources: i = ITIS, c = Catalogue of Life, g = GBIF, b = Bugguide.net

References

Hydrellia
Articles created by Qbugbot